Hampton in Arden packhorse bridge crosses the River Blythe near Hampton in Arden in the West Midlands (historically Warwickshire) of England, between Birmingham and Coventry. Dating from the 15th century, it is the only bridge of its kind in the area now covered by the West Midlands, and is a grade II* listed building and a scheduled monument.

Description
The bridge crosses the River Blythe between the parishes of Hampton in Arden and Berkswell. It consists of five arches, three of which are original and built from stone and two in red brick which are evidence of a later repair. The original arches are pointed (Gothic) and the later ones in segmental style. It has substantial triangular cutwaters on the upstream side and lesser, squared cutwaters on the downstream side. One of the piers supports the base of a cross. Above the cutwaters are refuges which allow pedestrians to move out of the carriageway. There is evidence of considerable repairs several times in the bridge's history.

Just upstream from the bridge is a ford. In the 1830s, the Blythe Viaduct was built to carry the London and Birmingham Railway slightly upstream from the packhorse bridge and the ford. The railway viaduct and the packhorse bridge both feature in an 1838 lithograph by John Cooke Bourne.

History
The bridge is believed to date from the 15th century. It is a packhorse bridge, once common in England. Such bridges provided safer river crossings compared with fords. Medieval traders used them with pack horses (animals laden with pannier bags containing merchandise) to carry goods to market. The bridge at Hampton in Arden is on an historical route between Hampton and Kenilworth. Hinchliffe defines most similar bridges which do not meet these criteria as cart bridges.

Edwin Jervoise's survey of ancient bridges for the Society for the Protection of Ancient Buildings in the 1930s determined that Hampton's was the only notable bridge on the Blythe. Another bridge known as a packhorse bridge crosses the Blythe at Blyth Hall but this bridge is much later, dating from the 18th century. The bridge is a grade II* listed building and a scheduled monument, both conservation statuses which provide legal protection from demolition or unauthorised modification. It is within the River Blythe Site of Special Scientific Interest.

See also
Grade II* listed buildings in the West Midlands
Scheduled monuments in the West Midlands

References

Grade II* listed buildings in the West Midlands (county)
Grade II* listed bridges in England
Scheduled monuments in the West Midlands (county)
Packhorse bridges
Bridges completed in the 15th century
Buildings and structures in Solihull